The Loue is a river of eastern France, a left tributary of the Doubs, which it joins downstream of Dole. Its source is a karst spring in the Jura mountains near Ouhans, which at least partly receives its water from the Doubs. This connection with the Doubs was discovered in 1901 when a spillage from the Pernod factory into the Doubs was transmitted into the Loue.

The Loue flows through the following departments and towns:

Doubs: Ornans, Quingey
Jura: Montbarrey

References

Rivers of France
Karst springs
Springs of France
Rivers of Doubs
Rivers of the Jura
Rivers of Bourgogne-Franche-Comté